The tenth season of Dancing with the Stars was announced in the May edition of New Idea magazine. It debuted on 27 June 2010 and ended on 29 August 2010.

Couples

Scoring chart 
Red numbers indicate the couples with the lowest score for each week.
Green numbers indicate the couples with the highest score for each week.
 indicates the couple (or couples) eliminated that week.
 indictates the couple withdrew from the competition.
 indicates the returning couple that finished in the bottom two.
 indicates the couple quit the competition.
 indicates the winning couple.
 indicates the runner-up couple.
 indicates the third-place couple.

Notes:

Week 1: Tamara Jaber scored the highest points of the night with 25/30 for her Cha-Cha-Cha. David Wirrpanda's Viennese Waltz was the lowest with 12/30. Jason Stevens's original partner, Linda DeNicola, was injured during their week of rehearsals and was replaced at the last minute by resident professional dancer Eliza Campagna. Pamela Anderson and Damien Whitewood performed their Cha-Cha-Cha from week one of Season 10 of Dancing With The Stars in America. Dance troupe Justice Crew also performed a routine.

Week 2: Tamara & Carmelo once again topped the leader board, scoring two 9s and a 10 from the judges for their Tango. David Wirrpanda doubled his week one score of 12/30 to 24/30 for his Jive. Rachael and Michael had points deducted for breaking hold during their tango. George Houvardas and Jason Stevens were in the bottom two, and Jason Stevens was the first contestant eliminated.

Week 3: Esther and Brendon tied with Tamara and Carmelo for first place, each couple receiving 24/30 for their Paso Dobles. Blair and Jessica, as well as George and Luda had points deducted as the judges felt the choreography for each routine did not match the music. The bottom two couples were Melinda & Serghei and Blair & Jessica. Blair and Jessica were unexpectedly eliminated, with their elimination being met by boos from the audience.

Week 4: Esther and Brendon took solo first place with 26/30 for their quickstep, making it the first time Tamara and Carmelo had not been the highest scoring couple. Every couple with the exception of David and Liza, Jo Beth and Dannial and Tamara and Carmelo received their highest scores in the competition. Jo Beth and Dannial and Tamara and Carmelo were both in the bottom two for the first time. Jo Beth had the lowest score for her rumba and was eliminated.

Week 5: For the first time in the competition, the top four highest scoring couples were all women. Tamara and Carmelo scored the second perfect 10 of the season for their samba and regained the top spot with a near-perfect 28/30. David and Liza were again in last place with 16/30 for their waltz. Kylie Minogue performed her new single All the Lovers. George and Luda were in the bottom two with Melinda and Serghei, with Melinda Schneider being the second woman to be eliminated from the competition.

Week 6: For the second week in a row, Tamara and Carmelo were in first place, scoring 27/30 for their Aussie smooth. For the third week in a row, David and Liza were in last place with 15/30 for their salsa. Indie UK band Florence & The Machine performed their song You've Got The Love. George and Luda were in the bottom two for their third time in the competition. Despite receiving their highest scores in the previous week, Rachael Finch and her partner Michael were the fifth couple eliminated.

Week 7: For week 7, the couples danced two unlearned dances each, which were to the theme of songs from the 1980s. Rob & Alana and Alex & Arsen shared first place after round one, with 24/30, with David & Liza in last place with 11/30 for their samba. For round two, Tamara & Carmelo were in first place, scoring 27/30 for their jive, with David & Liza once again in last place with 15/30 for their quickstep. When the scores were combined, Tamara and Rob shared the top spot with 50/60, with David in last place with 26/60. Receiving her lowest scores in the competition this week, Esther Anderson was eliminated.

Week 8: The first perfect score of the season was awarded to Tamara and Carmelo for their salsa, topping the leader board with 56/60 at the end of the night. David and Liza once again were at the bottom with 36/60 for their two dances. For the first time in 10 seasons of the Australian version of the show, David Wirrpanda voluntarily left the competition, receiving the lowest score of the competition for 8 out of his 10 dances. Because of this, no bottom two was necessary.

Week 9:  Each couple performed a dance chosen by the judges as a redemption dance. After the first round, Rob and Alana were in first place with 28/30, with Alex and Arsen in last place with 17/30. Each couple then performed a segue dance, with both Tamara and Carmello and Rob and Alana receiving 28/30, and George and Luda and Alex and Arsen receiving 24/30. Australian performer Vanessa Amorosi performed her new song Holiday which was accompanied by a dance by some of the professional cast. All four couples participated in a Swing Dance Off, with the winner receiving 10 points added to their final score. Tamara and Carmelo won the 10 points and won first place for the night, with a total of 65/70. Rob and Alana were in the bottom two with George and Luda. George Houvardas was eliminated.

Week 10:  The Grand Final began with each couple completing an unlearned dance from throughout the series. Tamara and Carmelo received another perfect score for their Rumba, putting them in first place after round one, with Alex and Arsen in third place with 23/30 for their Aussie Smooth. The Australian cast of the musical Hairspray then performed a medley of songs from their upcoming tour. All three finale couples participated in a Cha-Cha-Cha Face Off, which was learned 24 hours prior to the Grand Final night. Tamara and Carmello received 27/30, Rob and Alana received 23/30, while Alex and Arsen received 22/30. All eight previously eliminated couples, including David Wirrpanda, returned to the dance floor to perform their favourite dances of the season. Alex and Arsen were eliminated in third place but still performed their freestyle dance. Tamara and Carmelo performed their freestyle which they learned only two days prior to the finale, earning 27/30. Rob and Alana received a 30/30 for their final freestyle dance. At the end of the night, Tamara and Carmelo led the scoreboard with 84/90 for their three dances, while Rob and Alana earned 75/90. Despite earning second place on the scoreboard, Rob Palmer and his partner Alana Patience were named the Champions of Dancing With The Stars for 2010.

Dance schedule 
The celebrities and professional partners will dance one of these routines for each corresponding week.

Week 1 : Cha-Cha-Cha or Viennese Waltz
Week 2 : Jive or Tango
Week 3 : Paso Doble or Foxtrot
Week 4 : Rumba or Quickstep
Week 5 : Samba or Waltz
Week 6 : Salsa or Aussie Smooth
Week 7 : Two unlearned (80s themed) dances from weeks 1-6
Week 8 : Two unlearned dances from weeks 1-7
Week 9 : Judges choice, Segue and Swing Dance off
Week 10 : One unlearned dance from weeks 1-8, Cha-Cha-Cha Showdown and Freestyle

Dance chart 

 Highest scoring Dance
 Lowest scoring Dance
 Winner of the Swing Dance Off
 Runner Up of the Swing Dance Off
 Second Eliminated in the Swing Dance Off
 First Eliminated in the Swing Dance Off
 Performed but not scored

This dance was repeated by the couple at the finale.

Highest and lowest scoring performances 
The best and worst performances in each dance according to the judges' marks are as follows:

Couples' highest and lowest scoring dances

According to the traditional 30-point scale:

Average Chart 

The average chart is based on the dances performed by celebrities and not their place in the competition.

Running Order
Unless indicated otherwise, individual judges scores in the chart below (given in parentheses) are listed in this order from left to right: Todd McKenney, Helen Richey, Mark Wilson.

Week 1 

Running order

Week 2 
Running order

Week 3 
Running order

Week 4 
Running order

Week 5 
Running order

Week 6 
Running order

Week 7 
Running order

Week 8 
Running order

Week 9 
Running order

Week 10 
Running order

References

Season 10
2010 Australian television seasons